This table provides a list of scientific, nationwide public opinion polls that were conducted from the 2019 Canadian federal election leading up to the 2021 Canadian federal election, which took place on September 20, 2021. For riding-specific polls see the list of 2021 constituency polls.

National polls

Campaign period

Pre-campaign period

Regional polls
A number of polling firms survey federal voting intentions on a regional or provincial level:

Atlantic Canada

New Brunswick

Newfoundland and Labrador

Nova Scotia

Prince Edward Island

Central Canada

Quebec

Ontario

Greater Toronto Area

Western Canada

Manitoba

Alberta

British Columbia

Constituency polls

Leadership polls 
Aside from conducting the usual opinion surveys on general party preferences, polling firms also survey public opinion on which political party leader would make the best Prime Minister:

October 2020 – present

September 2020

October 2019 – August 2020

See also
 Opinion polling for the 2021 Canadian federal election by constituency
 Opinion polling for the 2019 Canadian federal election
 Opinion polling for the 2015 Canadian federal election
 Opinion polling for the 2011 Canadian federal election
 Opinion polling for the 2008 Canadian federal election
 Opinion polling for the 2006 Canadian federal election

Notes

References

2021
2021 Canadian federal election